Bravest Warriors is an American animated series created by Pendleton Ward, the creator of Adventure Time,

Set in the year 3085, the series follows four teenage heroes-for-hire as they warp through the universe to save adorable aliens and their worlds using the power of their emotions. The animated series began streaming on Frederator's Cartoon Hangover channel on YouTube from November 8, 2012. The series is based on a short produced for Frederator's Nicktoons animation incubator series Random! Cartoons that aired on January 10, 2009. A comic book adaptation published by Boom! Studios ran from October 2012 to September 2015 for 36 issues.

The show won the Shorty Award for Best Web Show in 2013 and was nominated in the Annecy International Animated Film Festival. It is also a 2015 Webby Award honoree.

Frederator Studios and Nelvana began production on a Bravest Warriors television series, which follows on from the web series. The first season of the series is accordingly considered as the fourth season.

Series overview

Pilot (2009)

Season 1 (2012–2013)

Minisodes (2013)

Season 2 (2013–2014)

Season 3 (2017) 
Starting on January 10, 2017, season 3 episodes of Bravest Warriors were released on VRV, an on-demand service from Crunchyroll.

Season 4 (2017–2018)

References

Bravest Warriors